Michael Altenburg (27 May 1584 – 12 February 1640) was a German theologian and composer.

Altenburg was born at Alach, near Erfurt. He began attending school in Erfurt in 1590; he began studying theology at the University of Erfurt in 1598, and was awarded a bachelor's degree in 1599 and a master's in 1603. From 1600 he taught at the Reglerschule in Erfurt; he was Kantor at St. Andreas from 1601 and rector of the school at St. Andreas in Erfurt from 1607. In 1609 he quit teaching to become a pastor, moving to Tröchtelborn and preaching there until 1621. During this period Altenburg published music, and was compared to Orlando di Lasso.

After 1621 he moved to Sömmerda, working at the Bonifaciuskirche. While he continued to publish and was respected for his compositions, the Thirty Years War sapped his efforts. In 1636 a massive plague wiped out most of his congregation, and his wife and ten of his children died before himself. He returned to Erfurt in 1637, where he remained as deacon and, from 1638, minister at St Andreas.

Much of Altenburg's compositional output consists of vocal concertos, motets and chorales.

Works, hymns, editions and recordings
Works
Passion after Isaiah ch. 53 for eight voices. Erfurt, 1608
Marriage motet for eight voices. Erfurt, 1613
Gaudium Christianum. Jena, 1617
Musikalischer Schirm und Schild der Bürger etc. oder der 55. Psalm a 6. Erfurt, 1618
Cantiones de adventu. Erfurt, 1620
Erster Theil Newer Lieblicher vnd Zierlicher Intraden a 6. Erfurt, 1620
Christliche liebliche und andächtige neue Kirchen- und Haus-Gesänge a 5, 6, 8. 3 Vols. Erfurt, 1620–21
Cantiones de adventu a 5, 6, 8. Erfurt, 1621
Musikalische Weihnachts- und Neujahrs-Zierde for 4-9 voices. Erfurt, 1621
Musikalisches Festgefüge for 5 to 14 voices. Four vols, (only 3rd and 4th survive). Erfurt, 1623

Hymn melodies
Aus Jacobs Stamm ein Stern sehr klar
Herr Gott, nun schleuß den Himmel auf
Herr Gott Vater, ich glaub an dich
Jesu, du Gottes Lämmlein
Verzage nicht, o Häuflein klein
Was Gott tut das ist wohlgethan, kein einzig Mensch ihn tadeln kann.

Editions
 Intraden  I-XVI, 2 Vols
 Puer natus in Bethlehem, from 1621 collection.
 Sechstimmige Advent- und Weihnachtsgesänge,
 Vierstimmige Weihnachtsgesänge

Recording
 Gaudium Christianum (Jena 1617) - Festmusik zur Reformationsfeier: Compositions: Das Lutherische Jubelgeschrey; Die Prophezeiung von Luthero; Das Lutherische Schloß oder Feste Burgk; Die Engelische Schlacht; Das Amen. Item Von Nun an bis in Ewigkeit; Das Amen Gott Vater und Sohne. With organ works by Sweelinck and Franz Tunder and motets to the Feast of Saint Michael by Samuel Scheidt, Heinrich Schütz, Melchior Franck, Demantius, and Johann Christoph Bach. Simone Schwark, Johanna Krell, Raimund Fürst, Kammerchor Bad Homburg, Johann Rosenmüller Ensemble, directed by Susanne Rohn. Christophorus. 2012

References

Further reading 
 Konrad Ameln, Michael Altenburg, in: Jahrbuch für Liturgik und Hymnologie 8, Stauda, Kassel 1963, 153–158.
 Karl Ernst Bergunder, Michael Altenburg, in: New Grove Music Dictionary of Music and Musicians, Vol. 1 A-Aristotle, 2nd ed., Macmillan Publishers, Oxford 2001, 425–426.
 Bießecker, Georg, Fünfstimmige Choralsätze des 16. und 17. Jahrhunderts: die Sätze in den Notendrucken - ihre Verwendung und ihre Besonderheiten ; die Sätze und die Komponisten - ihre Merkmale, Ruprecht-Karls-Universität Heidelberg, 2001, zugl. Diss, 20, 83–88, 105 f., 111f., 120, 122, 167–169, 182–184, 217, Notenbeispiele 43, 44, 64. Retrieved 22 July 2015.
 Friedrich Blume, Die evangelische Kirchenmusik, Handbuch der Musikwissenschaft, Akademische Verlagsgesellschaft Athenaion, Potsdam 1931, 100, 120f., 125.
 Friedrich Blume, Die Musik in Geschichte und Gegenwart : allgemeine Enzyklopädie der Musik, Bd. 1: Aa – Bae, 1. Auflage, Bärenreiter u. a., Kassel u. a. 1951, Bildtafel 12.
 Robert Eitner, Biographisch-bibliographisches Quellen-Lexikon der Musiker und Musikgelehrten christlicher Zeitrechnung bis Mitte des 19. Jahrhunderts, Bd. 1, Akad. Druck- u. Verlagsanstalt, Graz 1960, 118–119.
 Hans Engel, Musik in Thüringen, Bd. 39 Mitteldeutsche Forschung, Böhlau Verlag, Graz und Köln 1966, 1, 3, 16, 34, 44, 89, 184, 188,
 A. Fischer, W. Tümpel, Das deutsche evangelische Kirchenlied des 17. Jahrhunderts, Band 2, Gütersloh 1905, 56–63.
 Karl Goedeke, Grundriß zur Geschichte der deutschen Dichtung, Bd. 3, Vom Dreissigjährigen bis zum Siebenjährigen Kriege, Reprint der Ausgabe von 1887, Berlin 1979, 163 f.
 Walter Grundmann, Michael Altenburg: Gustav Adolfs Feldlied "Verzage nicht, du Ha¨uflein klein", Evangelische Verlagsanstalt, Jena 1954.
 Berthold Kitzig, Dichter und Komponist von "Verzage nicht, du Häuflein klein!", in: Beilage zur Sömmerdaer Zeitung, 1932, 237.
 Berthold Kitzig, Gustav Adolf, Jacobus Fabricius u. M. A., die drei Urheber des Liedes »Verzage nicht, du Häuflein klein!«, Vandenhoeck & Ruprecht, Göttingen 1935.
 Berthold Kitzig, Läßt sich die Frage nach dem Ursprung des Liedes »Verzage nicht, du Häuflein klein!« wiss. lösen?, in: Forschungen und Fortschritte: Nachrichtenblatt der deutschen Wissenschaft und Technik 11, Berlin 1935, 360–362.
 Wolfram Klante, "Ein neuer Aspekt in Michael Altenburgs Beziehungen zu Erfurt", in: Beiträge zur Musikwissenschaft, Academia Verlag, 1991, Bd. 33, 75–78.
 Daniel R. Melamed, Christoph Wolff, "Anguish of Hell and Peace of Soul – Angst der Hellen und Friede der Seelen" compiled by Burckhard Grossmann (Jena, 1623), A Collection of Sixteen Motets on Psalm 116 by Machael Preatorius, Heinricht Schütz and Others (Harvard Publications in Music, 18), Harvard 1994, 102–124.
 Ludwig Meinecke, Michael Altenburg: ein Beitrag zur Geschichte der evangelischen Kirchenmusik, in: Sammelbände der Internationalen Musik-Gesellschaft V, 1903/04, 1-45.
 Hermann Mendel, Michael Altenburg, in: Musikalisches Conversations-Lexikon, Eine Encyclopädie der gesamten musikalischen Wissenschaften, reprint der Ausgabe von 1870, Georg Olms Verlag, Hildesheim 2001, 185.
 Markus Rathey, Gaudium christianum. Michael Altenburg und das Reformationsjubiläum 1617, in: Schütz-Jahrbuch 1998, 107–122.
 Stephen Rose, The Mechanisms of the Music Trade in Central Germany, 1600–40, in: Journal of the Royal Music Association 130 No. 11-37, 1-36.
 Fritz Vahldieck, Gustav Adolfs Trutzlied, in: Die christliche Welt: protestantische Halbmonatsschrift 46, Leopold klotz Verlag, Gotha 1932, 972–975.
 Arno Werner, Die thüringer Musikerfamilie Altenburg, in: Sammelbände der Internationalen Musikgesellschaft 7 H1, Breitkopf & Härtel, Leipzig 1905, 119–124.
 Arno Werner, Die alte Musikbibliothek und die Instrumentensammlung an St. Wenzel in Naumburg a. d. Saale, in Archiv für Musikwissenschaft 8 H4, Breitkopf & Härtel, Leipzig 1927, 390–415.
 Carl von Winterfeld, Der evangelische Kirchengesang, vol. 2, Leipzig 1845, 78–87.

External links

 
 

1584 births
1640 deaths
German classical composers
German Baroque composers
17th-century classical composers
German male classical composers
German Lutheran hymnwriters
17th-century German composers
17th-century male musicians